Rafaelle Rabbia (17th century) was an Italian painter, mainly painting portraits. He was born in Marino, and active in 1610.

References

17th-century Italian painters
Italian male painters
Italian Baroque painters
Year of death unknown
Year of birth unknown